El pueblo is a Spanish comedy television series created by Alberto Caballero, Julián Sastre and Fernando Abad. The plot concerns the arrival of a group of city dwellers to a tiny village and their ensuing experiences. It debuted on Amazon Prime Video in May 2019.

Premise 
The plot concerns the arrival of a group of "urbanites" to a tiny Sorian village presumed to be abandoned (Peñafría) drawn by an offer of affordable housing. The village happens to preserve a small number of native inhabitants with whom the urban immigrants interact.

Cast 
 Carlos Areces as Juanjo Soler.
 Ruth Díaz as Laura.
 Santi Millán as Moncho.
 Ingrid Rubio as Ruth.
  as Macarena.
 María Hervás as Amaya.
  as Pablo Armida.
  as Elisa Jiménez.
  as Cándido Quintanilla, the Mayor.
 Vicente Gil as Arsacio.
  as María.
  as El Ovejas.
  as Nacho.
 Norma Ruiz as Isa.
  as Gustavo.
  as Echegui.
 Jordi Vilches as Chicho.

Production and release 

Created by Alberto Caballero, Julián Sastre and Fernando Abad, El pueblo was produced by Mediaset España in collaboration with Conturbernio Films. Alberto Caballero (on behalf of Contubernio films) and Arantxa Écija (on behalf of Mediaset España) were credited as executive producers. Alberto Caballero, Laura Caballero and Roberto Monge directed the episodes, whereas Daniel Deorador and Araceli Álvarez de Sotomayor joined Alberto Caballero, Julián Sastre and Fernando Abad in the writing team. The first season consisted of 8 episodes featuring a running time of around 70 minutes. The first season was entirely shot in the province of Soria. While Valdelavilla was primarily used to portray the fictional village of Peñafría, other shooting locations included San Pedro Manrique, Valdeavellano de Tera, Los Rábanos and Soria.

Just like with other series, the Mediaset España's distributor 	Mediterráneo Mediaset España Group reached an agreement to cede the exclusive rights to Amazon Prime Video for a time before its free-to-air broadcasting run. The first season was thus originally released on Prime Video on 14 May 2019.

Filming of the second season was wrapped in October 2019. The second season consisted of another 8 episodes (featuring a 50-minute-long runtime on Amazon and a 70-min run for a later free-to-air airing). It was released on Prime Video on 14 February 2020.

Awards and nominations 

|-
| align = "center" rowspan = "2" | 2021 || rowspan = "2" | 8th  || colspan = "2" | Best Comedy Series ||  || rowspan = "2" | 
|-
| Best Comedy Actor || Raúl Fernández || 
|}

References 

Television shows set in Castile and León
Spanish-language television shows
Spanish-language Amazon Prime Video original programming
2010s Spanish comedy television series
2020s Spanish comedy television series
2019 Spanish television series debuts
Television shows filmed in Spain